Ajay Varma may refer to:

Ajay Varma (Kerala cricketer), bowler for Kerala cricket team
Ajay Varma (Bengal cricketer), all-rounder for Bengal cricket team
Ajay Varma (actor), Telugu actor known for Nandanavanam 120km